Leptomesosa cephalotes is a species of beetle in the family Cerambycidae. It was described by Maurice Pic in 1903, originally under the genus Mesosa. It is known from Laos and China.

References

Mesosini
Beetles described in 1903